Pacetown is an unincorporated community in Cedar County, in the U.S. state of Missouri.

The community derives its name from Ike Pace, a local merchant.

References

Unincorporated communities in Cedar County, Missouri
Unincorporated communities in Missouri